Y Tu Tambien is a project ran in New York City to aid low-income students through the college admission process. It is coordinated by members of the Inter-Ivy Latino Alumni Council (IILAC), which was developed in early 2012 as a result of an All-Ivy Latino Alumni Mixer held at the University of Pennsylvania. Y Tu Tambien regularly holds workshops helping high school students format their college essays, prepare for college interviews, and even select which colleges to apply to. The organization has just recently began its IILAC Fellowship Program, under which it selects a few number of high school under class-men (students in their freshman or sophomore years of high school) to provide individualized mentorship throughout their high school careers. Although it is run by the Ivy League, its mission statement clearly states it helps all students applying to any college institution.

Aid in college admission process

Workshops for those who are already applying
Y Tu Tambien runs parallel to the Admissions process. So, it holds different workshops according to where in the application process students should be at certain points in the year. For example, the first workshop of the school year is held for all Early Decision applicants. In preparation for the early November deadline many colleges have, the Early Decision workshop is held in October, where students may pre submit college essays or bring them to the meeting to have them reviewed by an alumnus of the Ivy League. In this workshop, Y Tu Tambien also reviews students' Common Application, the application they use to apply to a majority of colleges, and goes over the benefits of Financial Aid from a prestigious institution. Afterwards, another meeting encompassing similar objectives is held in the December for all Regular Decision applicants.

After applications are submitted, Y Tu Tambien continues holding workshops to aid students throughout the interview process of applying to college. To help with the process, the organization holds workshops both in specific high schools—although still open to students not attending these high schools—and in general local spots for a more variable attendance. Two high schools the organization has held interview workshops at are the prestigious Brooklyn Technical High School and Stuyvesant High School.

Workshops for those still months from applying
Help is not, however, excluded to only those already writing an application. During the Spring season, Y Tu Tambien begins holding workshops inviting high school students from all class years to begin associating them with concept of the college admission process. These workshops do not go over any of the students' physical material to submit, as there is none this early in the process, but rather explains to them the benefits of going to a four-year institutions and the possibility of that institution being a prestigious one. In these workshops, students are told about choosing the right college for themselves, and also the effects of a college's name on one's professional future. Because Y Tu Tambien is run by ILAAC, these workshops are usually attended by alumni from many of the Ivy League institutions, giving many students a chance to interact with people who have first hand experience of studying at these institutions. Because many students may be unaware of how Financial Aid can make even the most expensive schools affordable, Financial Aid is also an important topic in these workshops.

Networking
Y Tu Tambien also holds career-centered workshops for all high school and undergraduate students. These workshops do not follow a chronological rule, except that they do not interfere with the workshops that take place during the application season. As a result, these workshops occur regularly during May, throughout the summer, and even early October. For these workshops, Y Tu Tambien brings in distinguished IILAC members to represent separate parts of the professional job field. Common careers sectors spoken about during these workshops have been Law, Business, Medicine, and Non-Profit Management. Alumni here speak about how they feel their institutions have helped them reach the positions they are in today, and how they came to choose their job field. These alumni also make sure to meet the students, since workshops are small in size due to an attendee limit.

Objective of raising Latino representation

Current Latino attendance in the College Sphere
Both in its mission statement and throughout its event updates, Y Tu Tambien states an innate goal to raise the Latino representation, along with the representation of other minorities in the prestigious college sphere. According to the 2010 census, only thirteen percent of Latino citizens, 25 or older, had a bachelor's degree, a percentage much lower than the Caucasian American statistic of 29.3 percent that same year, and actually the lowest of all the demographics' percentages. By 2012, that statistic had only risen to 13.8 percent. Further aiding this disadvantage is the fact that almost two thirds of Latino students are either First or Second Generation, meaning they are either themselves foreign-born or at least one of their parents is. Furthermore, even the most prestigious institutions, like Brown University, which tend to make an effort at imitating the demographic make up of the nation, could only reach a Latino population in the school of eleven percent, where the percentage of Latinos that make up the nation's population is seventeen. To help offset this imbalance, or this gap in equal results, IILAC joined together and created Y Tu Tambien, using the volunteering of the Latino population that has made it into an Ivy League to help students still in grade school succeed academically.

It is too early to see whether or not Y Tu Tambien has actually made any progress increasing overall Latino representation in colleges, however feed updates show it has been successful entering students into the Ivy League and other prestigious institutions. Although the organization holds a focus on aiding specifically students of Latino heritage, photos of its workshops show it has not excluded any students from seeking help based on race or ethnicity.

IILAC Fellowship Program
The IILAC Fellowship Program is a more holistic program, in that rather than helping students by having them come to specific workshops, instead Y Tu Tambien places an eye of mentorship on the individual student. To be eligible for the program, a student must be a rising freshman, rising sophomore, or rising junior. That is, the student cannot have already been a junior when applying to this program. The most recent application asked for logistics like grade point average and high school of the student, but also insightful questions like "What does being Latino/Latina mean to you?"

The program is structured to assign each individual Fellow a mentor that guides him through his high school career. The program aims to increase the student's performance in the college processes in two manners. First, it assures that each student has a set mentorship watching over his academic performance; therefore, the student will have academic standing that has been bolstered by a highly educated personal guide. Grades, extracurriculars, and novelty in a high school environment are all factors that a mentor would aim to help set above a certain standard. Second, in its Project announcement, Y Tu Tambien stated that concept of having a mentor alone, and one that graduated from a prestigious institution although having been Latino, would be inspiring enough to create an innate will within the student to succeed throughout high school. Essentially, this program assures a student receives necessary aid much before the college process even begins, so that a student would already be well prepared for writing a college application.

References

Non-profit organizations based in the United States
Ivy League